The Thakali are an ethnolinguistic Tibetan-Burmese ethnic group from the Thak Khola region of Mustang District in the Gandaki Province of Nepal. Thak-sat-se is the traditional area of the Thakali community, which lies over Mustang District, the valley of the Kali Gandaki river in western Nepal. According to the 2001 census, Thakali population of around 12,973 constituted only 0.06% of Nepal's population. As per the 2011 Nepal census, there are 13,215 Thakali people in Nepal.

Lhafewa (Barha Barse Kumbha Mela), Toranlha (ancestral worship) and Falo (Kumar Yatra) are the major festivals of Thakalis. Dhnom is the title of the Thakali priest who performs the work of the local shaman. Madaal, Khaprang and Thamken are their main musical instruments.
Among the Thakalis, there are 4 types Thakali people who consider themselves Thakali. All four caste are different according to the Census of Nepal.  Teen Gauley ( Thakali from Thini, Syang and Chimang village), Marphali (Thakali from Marpha village, classified as Hirachan  Pannachan, Jwarchan, Lalchan), 4 jaat (Sherchan, Tulachan, Bhattachan, Gauchan) and Thakali (Thakali from Southern Mustang Tukuche and Jomsom). They all consider themselves as different caste and consider themselves as Thakali. The customs, culture, dress and festival are slightly different from each other.

See also
Toran La, a festival of Thakali people
Nepal
Mustang District
Dhaulagiri

References

External links 

Ethnic groups in Nepal